The following is a list of fictional astronauts from recent times, mostly using the Space Shuttle, as depicted in works released between 1975 and 1989.

1975–1979

1980–1989

Notes

References

Lists of fictional astronauts